Hyetussa alternata is a species of jumping spider in the family Salticidae. It is found in the United States.

References

Further reading

 
 
 
 
 
 
 

Salticidae
Spiders described in 1936